Paddy Nixon is a  computer scientist and Vice-Chancellor and President of the University of Canberra, in Australia. He took up  office in April 2020.

From July 2015 to January 2021, he was Vice-Chancellor and President of Ulster University and on the board of Universities UK, chair of Universities Ireland and was on the Northern Ireland Council of the Confederation of British Industry. Prior to that he was Deputy Vice-Chancellor (Research) at the University of Tasmania.

Background
Nixon is originally from Liverpool in the United Kingdom. He attended St. Anselm's College, obtained a B.Sc. (Hons) in Computer Science from University of Liverpool, a Ph.D. in Computer Engineering from University of Sheffield and M.A. from Trinity College Dublin. He is an elected Fellow of the British Computer Society, the Royal Society of Arts, and the Royal Society of New South Wales.

Career

Research and teaching

He has held academic positions at Trinity College Dublin, University of Strathclyde, and University College Dublin. While at Trinity College he was Warden of Trinity Hall, Dublin.

Nixon's research specialism is large-scale distributed systems with a particular focus on software infrastructure including pervasive systems, sensor systems, middleware, web services, trust, and privacy. Nixon has published over 220 publications and he has edited 9 books.

Nixon was Science Foundation Ireland Research Professor in Distributed Systems at University College Dublin (2005-2010). He has extensive industry and commercial experience, collaborating with global high tech firms such as Microsoft, Oracle, IBM and Intel. He was an IBM faculty fellow at the IBM Dublin Institute for Advanced Study and from 2007 to 2010 he was Academic Director of Intel's Independent Living and Digital Health. He was also instrumental in the establishment UCD's  Complex and Adaptive Systems Laboratory (CASL) focusing on the inter-disciplinary research at the intersection of mathematics, computation and scientific discovery.

Nixon has been a visiting academic / professor at California Institute of Technology, University of Warsaw, and Kaunas University of Technology.

Technology transfer
Having been involved in three start-up companies, Nixon has a particular interest in the commercialisation of university research and the interface between universities and industry. In 2006 he led the consortium that bid for, and subsequently established, National Digital Research Centre (NDRC); a national early stage investor in tech companies in Ireland.

Administration
Nixon was Deputy Vice-Chancellor (Research) at the University of Tasmania until 2015.

References

External links
 http://www.ulster.ac.uk/staff/Vice-Chancellor.html

Academics from Liverpool
English computer scientists
Researchers in distributed computing
Vice-Chancellors of Ulster University
Alumni of the University of Sheffield
Academics of the University of Liverpool
Year of birth missing (living people)
Living people
Alumni of the University of Liverpool
Academic staff of the University of Tasmania